Merritt Airport , also known as Saunders Field, is located  east of Merritt, British Columbia, Canada.

References

External links
Merritt Airport - Saunders Field on COPA's Places to Fly airport directory

Merritt Flying Club

Registered aerodromes in British Columbia
Thompson-Nicola Regional District